Attack: Part 1 is a 2022 Indian Hindi-language science fiction action film directed by Lakshya Raj Anand, who co-wrote the film with Sumit Batheja and Vishal Kapoor, based on a story by John Abraham, who stars in the film alongside Jacqueline Fernandez and Rakul Preet Singh, with Prakash Raj and Ratna Pathak Shah in supporting roles.

Attack was released on 1 April 2022 in cinemas. The film received mixed reviews from critics who praised the action sequences while criticizing the screenplay, eventually bombing at the box office.

Plot
25 November 2010: Arjun Shergill is an Indian Army officer, who embarks on a mission to capture Rehman Gul, a dreaded terrorist, who attacked the Indian army convoy two days ago. A tense shootout between the soldiers and terrorists ensues where Arjun manages to arrest Rehman, while also saving a suicide bomber, who is actually Rehman's son Hamid Gul.

12 years later: While leaving for his hometown at the Mumbai Airport, Arjun meets an air hostess Ayesha and the two fall in love with each other. However, their happiness is short lived, when the airport is attacked by Hamid's men and several others including Ayesha is killed. Arjun gets injured in the fight, but recovers two weeks later and is bound in the wheel chair with only movement in his neck. Vadraj Kumar Subramaniam/V. K. Subramaniam, who is the Chief of Indian Intelligence and Arjun's superior officer, proposes the idea of introducing a supersoldier program to the PM, which is operated through AI to save lives in times of war from any collateral damage. The supersoldiers are programmed by DRDO scientist Sabaha Qureshi, who has been modifying the program for 7 years and is on the verge of a major breakthrough.

The PM agrees to the proposal, but Sabaha explains that the program is developed on paralysed persons. Subramaniam selects Arjun for the program. Arjun though hesitant at first then agrees to the program, as he wants to avenge Ayesha's death. While going through the surgical process, Arjun's chances of survival are shown to be minimal, but manages to survive the on-boarding process. Arjun operates himself, under the command of the Intelligence Robotic Assistant or I.R.A, but the I.R.A gets restricted due to Arjun's trauma. Meanwhile, the government receives information that Hamid is procuring chemical weapons in Eastern Europe. The next day, Sabaha arrives at the Parliament to submit Arjun's progress to the Defence Minister, as advised by Subramaniam. While having a conversation with I.R.A, Arjun learns that Hamid is planning to attack the Parliament and informs Subramaniam, who is at the Sansad Marg.

However, Hamid and his fellow terrorists disguised as RAF personnel, thwart all security and hijack the Parliament, capturing the Parliament Ministry and other Union ministers, including the PM and Sabaha. Arjun leaves for the Parliament, along with NSG commandos, but Hamid communicates with the government, who demands that the NSG should retreat from the Parliament, in exchange for the release of 50 hostages. Subramabiam insists to the Home Minister Digvijay Singh (who is appointed as the Caretaker Prime Minister) and others to perform a partial extraction and sends Arjun to provide information regarding the incidents inside the Parliament. Arjun sneaks into the Parliament with I.R.A's help and kills 4-5 guards where he barges into the control room and provides live feed to Subramaniam.

Hamid demands the release of Rehman. Sabaha gets caught by the terrorist Hussain, while seeking help from Arjun, but Arjun rescues her by killing Hussain and other terrorists where the two escape, thus making Hamid believe that someone else has arrived and orders to find him. Arjun reveals himself to Hamid via a walkie talkie where Hamid forces Digvijay, Subramaniam and others to force Arjun to surrender. Subramaniam tells Arjun to surrender, which he decides to do, so that he can kill Hamid and save the hostages. Arjun surrenders and is taken to Hamid where one of Hamid's men knocks Arjun's neck, which leads to malfunction in I.R.A. Hamid demands a safe passage to flee in an airline, which leaves to Ecuador and releases the hostages, but activates a sarin gas bomb to explode in the Parliament. Rehman is released from prison and is taken to the airport.

Meanwhile, Sabaha retrieves her bag, which contains her laptop and begins the reboot of I.R.A. With I.R.A rebooted, Arjun attacks and kills all the terrorists. Arjun tells Subramaniam about the bomb and asks to intercept Hamid, but Hamid had already fled by using an old tunnel in the Parliament and leaves for the airport in an ambulance. Arjun tells Sabaha to retreat with the hostages and chases after Hamid where he reaches the airport and manages to crash the flight. Arjun kills Hamid and deactivates the bomb. Sabaha rescues the hostages and Rehman is killed by the NSG Commandos by throwing him out of the flight in mid-air. Arjun is appreciated by Subramaniam and the ministers, and leaves the parliament on an ambulance. Later, Arjun is appointed for another mission, thus hinting at the sequel Attack: Part 2.

Cast
 John Abraham as Lieutenant Major Arjun Shergill, a cyborg & India’s first supersoldier
 Rakul Preet Singh as Dr. Sabaha Qureshi, DRDO scientist
 Jacqueline Fernandez as Ayesha Roy, an air hostess and Arjun's lover 
 Prakash Raj as Vadraj Kumar "V.K" Subramaniam, Defence Secretary and Arjun's superior officer
 Ratna Pathak Shah as Shanti Shergill, Arjun's mother
 Serena Walia as I.R.A (voice), Arjun's personal AI assistant
 Elham Ehsas as Hamid Gul, Rehman's son and the main antagonist
 Rajit Kapur as Home Minister Digvijay Singh
 Kiran Kumar as Indian Army Chief K.V. Singh
 Habib Al Aidroos as Rehman Gul, Hamid's father
 Tamara D'Souza as Juhi, Ayesha's friend
 Mir Mehroos as Young Hamid Gul
 Jaimini Pathak as Negotiator Sukrut
 Babrak Akbari as Mustafa
 Nimish Desai as Prime Minister
 Ashish Nijhawan as Hussain
 Shahnawaz Bhatt as Saqlain
 Vikas Tomar as Home Minister's Assistant
 Ranjit Punia as CRPF Officer
 Ranjeet Singh as RAF Officer
 Karan Mehat as Shahid

Production
Principal photography began in January 2020. Production was put on hold in March 2020 due to COVID-19 pandemic. The shooting resumed in February 2021.

Release
The film was originally scheduled for theatrical opening worldwide on 14 August 2020. However, it was delayed due to the shooting suspension. It was scheduled for release on 28 January 2022, however, it was postponed due to the surge in Omicron variant cases. It was theatrically released on 1 April 2022. The film streamed on ZEE5 on 27 May.

Reception

Box office 
Attack earned 3.51 crore at the domestic box office on its opening day. On the second day, the film collected 3.75 crore. On the third day the film had a worldwide gross of 4.25 crore, taking total domestic weekend collection to 11.51 crore.

, the film grossed  crore in India and  crore overseas, for a worldwide gross collection of  crore.

Critical response
The film received mixed reviews from critics who praised the action sequences while criticising the screenplay. Rachana Dubey of The Times of India gave the film a rating of 3.5/5 and wrote "Attack: Part One, is an engaging watch, from start to finish". Grace Cyril of India Today gave the film a rating of 3/5 and wrote "Attack stands well with its VFX and new concepts, all coated in a layer of slick modern sci-fi". Avinash Lohana of Pinkvilla gave the film a rating of 3/5 and wrote "Keep an open mind, don’t compare, and give the film a chance. You might like it". Bharathi Pradhan of Lehren gave the film a rating of 3/5 and wrote "John may take a bow because he is one of the producers of the film and has been credited with the story idea too". Taran Adarsh of Bollywood Hungama gave the film a rating of 3/5 and wrote "ATTACK - PART 1 works due to the novel concept, action, VFX and John Abraham’s first-rate performance". Rohit Bhatnagar of The Free Press Journal gave the film a rating of 3/5 and wrote "'Attack - Part 1' might be a beginning of a new era in the Hindi film industry only if you ignore the long list of loopholes and cliché sequences".
 
Saibal Chatterjee of NDTV gave the film a rating of 2.5/5 and wrote "To the credit of director Lakshya Raj Anand, the fast-paced hostage drama stops short of being a dreadful assault on the senses". Shubhra Gupta of Indian Express gave the film a rating of 2.5/5 and wrote "We know exactly how things will pan out, no strain on the brain. Everything is straight-forward, no complicated characters, no morally ambiguous situations". Shubham Kulkarni of Koimoi gave the film a rating of 2/5 and wrote "Lakshya Raj Anand only focuses on the battle sequences and everything that happens between them looks lazy". Tatsam Mukherjee of Firstpost gave the film a rating of 1/5 and wrote "Whatever might be the measures taken by an earlier John Abraham film, there seems to be a renewed bloodlust in Attack, that’s actively trying to court the ‘masses’ of Uri: The Surgical Strike and The Kashmir Files".

Soundtrack 

The film's music is composed by Shashwat Sachdev while lyrics written by Kumaar and Bjorn Surrao.

References

External links 
 
 Attack at Bollywood Hungama
 Attack at ZEE5

2022 films
Films postponed due to the COVID-19 pandemic
2022 science fiction action films
Indian science fiction action films
2020s Hindi-language films
Films scored by Shashwat Sachdev
Cyberpunk films